An earthquake struck Turkey's eastern Erzincan Province at  with a moment magnitude of 7.8  and a maximum Mercalli intensity of XII (Extreme). It is the joint second most-powerful earthquake recorded in Turkey, tied with the 2023 Turkey–Syria earthquake. Only the 1668 North Anatolia earthquake was more powerful. This was one of the largest in a sequence of violent shocks to affect Turkey along the North Anatolian Fault between 1939 and 1999. Surface rupturing, with a horizontal displacement of up to 3.7 meters, occurred in a 360 km long segment of the North Anatolian Fault Zone. The earthquake was the most severe natural loss of life in Turkey in the 20th century, with 32,968 dead, and some 100,000 injured.

Preface
The North Anatolian Fault in Asia Minor is a major transform fault boundary where the Eurasian Plate slides past the smaller Anatolian Microplate. Running for over 1,600 km, the fault stretches from Eastern Turkey to the Sea of Marmara.
The North Anatolian fault has been, and remains very active. Erzincan has been destroyed by earthquakes at least 11 times since 1,000 AD. Between 1942 and 1967, there were six major earthquakes along the same fault, with three above 7 .

Earthquake 
With an epicenter near the city of Erzincan, the earthquake rupture propagated westwards for a length of 400 km. Surface ruptures are still visible to this day. Up to 360 km of surface rupture was formed. An average surface displacement of between 2.3 meters and 8.8 meters was calculated. Vertical displacements measured 0.5–2.0 meters. The maximum horizontal slip was 10.5 meters. The shaking lasted for 52 seconds. It resulted in a tsunami with heights of  that hit the Black sea coast. Coulomb stress transfer from the 1939 earthquake promoted westward-progressing ruptures along the North Anatolian Fault. Ten earthquakes greater than magnitude 6.7 have ruptured a 1,000 km portion of the fault since 1939.

Damage 
The earthquake seriously damaged some 116,720 buildings. Occurring in winter, it was difficult for aid to reach the affected areas.

Initially, the death toll was about 8,000 people. The next day on 27 December, it was reported that it had risen to 20,000. An emergency rescue operation began. By January 5, almost 33,000 had died due to the earthquake and due to low temperatures, blizzard conditions and floods.

Aftermath

The total destruction of the earthquake prompted Turkey to adopt seismic building regulations. So extensive was the damage to the city of Erzincan that its old site was entirely abandoned and a new settlement was founded a little further to the north.

See also 
 List of earthquakes in 1939
 List of earthquakes in Turkey
 Osman Nuri Tekeli

References

Further reading

External links 
 
 33 bin kişinin can verdiği Erzincan Depremi'nin acısı 82 yıldır dinmiyor - Anadolu Agency

1939 Erzincan
1939 tsunamis
1939 in Turkey
1939 earthquakes
History of Erzincan Province
Tsunamis in Turkey
December 1939 events
Strike-slip earthquakes